Sergey Pomoshnikov (born 17 July 1990) is a Russian former professional racing cyclist.

Major results

2012
 1st Grand Prix des Marbriers
 1st Stage 1 Tour of Bulgaria
 6th Overall Tour de l'Avenir
1st Stage 6
 9th Overall Istrian Spring Trophy
 10th Trofeo Zsšdi
2013
 7th Gran Premio Bruno Beghelli
2014
 10th Giro dell'Appennino
2015
 2nd Overall Tour de Serbie
1st Stage 3
 5th Grand Prix Sarajevo
 7th Giro del Medio Brenta
 8th Overall Sibiu Cycling Tour
 9th Overall Black Sea Cycling Tour
 10th Overall Tour of Bulgaria

References

External links

1990 births
Living people
Russian male cyclists
Sportspeople from Samara, Russia
21st-century Russian people